In mathematics, the Fuchs relation is a relation between the starting exponents of formal series solutions of certain linear differential equations, so called Fuchsian equations. It is named after Lazarus Immanuel Fuchs.

Definition Fuchsian equation 
A linear differential equation in which every singular point, including the point at infinity, is a regular singularity is called Fuchsian equation or equation of Fuchsian type. For Fuchsian equations a formal fundamental system exists at any point, due to the Fuchsian theory.

Coefficients of a Fuchsian equation 
Let  be the  regular singularities in the finite part of the complex plane of the linear differential equation

with meromorphic functions . For linear differential equations the singularities are exactly the singular points of the coefficients.  is a Fuchsian equation if and only if the coefficients are rational functions of the form

 

Fuchs relation 
Let  be a Fuchsian equation of order  with the singularities  and the point at infinity. Then the so called Fuchs relation holds:

 .

The Fuchs relation can be rewritten as infinite sum. Define  as

 

where  gives the trace of a polynomial , i. e.,  denotes the sum of a polynomial's roots counted with multiplicity.

The rewritten Fuchs relation is:

References 

 
 
 
 

Complex analysis
Differential equations